Bianca Andreescu was the defending champion from when the event was last held in 2019, but lost in the third round to Ons Jabeur.

Camila Giorgi won her maiden WTA 1000 title, defeating Karolína Plíšková in the final, 6–3, 7–5. It was Giorgi's third career WTA Tour title, and her first since Linz in 2018.

Seeds
The top eight seeds received a bye into the second round.

Draw

Finals

Top half

Section 1

Section 2

Bottom half

Section 3

Section 4

Qualifying

Seeds

Qualifiers

First qualifier

Second qualifier

Third qualifier

Fourth qualifier

Fifth qualifier

Sixth qualifier

Seventh qualifier

Eighth qualifier

References

External links
 Main draw
 Qualifying draw

Women's Singles